Agapio Racing Team Oy (also known as Nordic Agapio) was a Finnish dubbing company that dubbed a number of cartoons for VHS release and Finnish television, primarily MTV3 and Nelonen. They also did regular dubbing of many cartoon releases by Future Films. The company became notorious for the lack of immersion and professionalism, even more so than Golden Voice. The company eventually disassembled in 2002 after their last dubbing effort, Digimon Adventure, was taken over by Tuotantotalo Werne following public outrage (Only for the last half of the second season being aired in its original language with Finnish subtitles).

Agapio Racing Team cast is sometimes referred to as "Digimon cast" after their work on Digimon, by people and fans who don't necessarily know their names.

About the Company
Just as Golden Voice before it, Agapio Racing Team has received mixed to negative opinions, mostly for their voice actors being accused of lacking immersion in their performances. The recording voice-level for the dubs were often low and the actors would rarely go to any great lengths to make actions such as screaming, laughing or crying seem credible on screen. Some foul language was also used in Digimon dubs. The actors were mostly teenagers who were inexperienced. The quality of the scripts has been criticized as well, though a former Agapio employee stated that the translations usually came from translators outside the studio and were often nonsensical, and the breakneck speed that Agapio was forced to work at due to these delays only made things worse.

Agapio also decided inexplicably to dub several theme songs, with little regard to the actors' actual singing ability and with rigidly translated lyrics. Most notorious of these was the theme of Flipper and Lopaka, which aired on MTV3. Additionally the company also dubbed the singing portions of Alvin and the Chipmunks and Casper, which were later re-dubbed by Tuotantotalo Werne, while other dubs such as Golden Voice left these segments intact.

It wasn't until their Digimon dub for Nelonen caused controversy regarding the company's lack of professionalism, which led to their downfall and eventual disestablishment.

However, the company has later received a cult following, despite mixed opinions still remaining.

Actors
 Pauli Talikka
 Eeva Penttilä 
 Valtteri Korpela 
 Antti Kainiemi 
 Lauri Putkonen 
 Oskari Paavonkallio

List of dubs
 My Little Pony
 My Little Pony Tales
 Calimero & Friends (episodes 1-26)
 The Spooktacular New Adventures of Casper
 The Legends of Treasure Island
 Flipper and Lopaka
 Ivanhoe the King's Knight
 The Care Bears
 Peter Pan & the Pirates
 Little Hippo
 Princess Sissi
 The Magic School Bus
 The Smurfs
 Digimon Adventure (episodes 1-26)

My Little Pony and The Smurfs had previously been dubbed by Golden Voice.

The themesongs of Flipper & Lopaka, Calimero and Digimon were both re-recorded for the Finnish version and noted for featuring low-level singing by the voice-crew.

See also
 Golden Voice Oy
 Tuotantotalo Werne

References

External links
 I hate Agapio racing team, features sample clips.

Mass media companies of Finland
Companies established in 1993
1993 establishments in Finland
Companies disestablished in 2002
2002 disestablishments in Finland